Zorya (lit. "Dawn"; also many variants: Zarya, Zara, Zorza, Zaranitsa, Zoryushka, etc.) is a figure in Slavic folklore, a feminine personification of dawn, possibly goddess. Depending on tradition, she may appear as a singular entity, often called "The Red Maiden", or two or three sisters at once. Although Zorya is etymologically unrelated to the Proto-Indo-European goddess of the dawn *H₂éwsōs, she shares most of her characteristics. She is often depicted as the sister of the Sun, the Moon, and Zvezda, the Morning Star with which she is sometimes identified. She lives in the Palace of the Sun, opens the gate for him in the morning so that he can set off on a journey through the sky, guards his white horses, she is also described as a virgin. In the Eastern Slavic tradition of zagovory she represents the supreme power that a practitioner appeals to.

Etymology 
The all-Slavic word zora "dawn, aurora" (from Proto-Slavic *zoŗà), and its variants, comes from the same root as the all-Slavic word zrěti ("to see, observe", from PS *zьrěti), which originally may have meant "shine". The word zara may have originated under the influence of the word žar "heat" (PS *žarь). PS *zoŗà comes from the Proto-Balto-Slavic *źoriˀ (cf. Lithuanian žarà, žarijà), the etymology of the root is unclear.

Comparative mythology 

The Proto-Indo-European reconstructed goddess of the dawn is *H₂éwsōs. Her name was reconstructed using a comparative method on the basis of the names of Indo-European goddesses of the dawn, e.g. Greek Eos, Roman Aurora, or Vedic Ushas; similarly, on the basis of the common features of the goddesses of the dawn, the features of the Proto-Indo-European goddess were also reconstructed.

Although the Zorya cult is only attested in folklore, its roots go back to Indo-European antiquity, and the Zorya herself manifests most of *H₂éwsōs characteristics. Zorya shares the following characteristics with most goddesses of the dawn:

 She appears in the company of St. George and St. Nicholas (interpreted as divine twins)
 Red, gold, yellow, rose colors
 She lives overseas, on the island of Buyan
 Opens the door to the Sun
 She owned a golden boat and a silver oar

Zarubin  undertook a comparison between Slavic folklore and the Indo-Aryan Rigveda and Atharvaveda, where images of the Sun and its companions, the Dawns, have been preserved. These images date back to ancient concepts from the initially fetishistic (the Sun in the form of a ring or circle) to the later anthropomorphic. Chludov's Novgorod Psalter of the late 13th century contains a miniature depicting two women. One of them, fiery red, signed as "morning zora", holds a red sun in her right hand in the form of a ring, and in her left hand she holds a torch resting on her shoulder, ending in a box from which emerges a light green stripe passing into dark green. This stripe ends in another woman's right hand, in green, signed as "evening zora", with a bird emerging from her left sleeve. This should be interpreted as the Morning Zorya releasing the Sun on its daily journey, and at sunset the Evening Zorya awaits to meet the Sun. A very similar motif was found in a cave temple from the 2nd or 3rd century AD in Nashik, India. The bas-relief depicts two women: one using a torch to light the circle of the Sun, and the other expecting it at sunset. Some other bas-reliefs depict two goddesses of the dawn, Ushas and Pratyusha, and the Sun, accompanied by Dawns, appears in several hymns. The Sun in the form of a wheel appears in the Indo-Aryan Rigveda, or the Norse Edda, as well as in folklore: during the annual festivals of the Germanic peoples and Slavs, they lit a wheel which, according to medieval authors, was supposed to symbolize the sun.

Similar images to the one from the Psalter and the Nashik appear in various parts of Slavic lands, e.g. On a carved and painted gate of a Slovak peasant estate (village of Očová): on one of the pillars is carved the Morning Zora, with a golden head, above her is a glow, and even higher is the Sun, which rolls along an arched road, and on the other pillar is carved the Evening Zora, above it is a setting sun. There are also darkened suns on this relief, possibly dead suns appearing in Slavic folklore. These motifs are also confirmed by the Russian saying "The sun will not rise without the Morning Zoryushka". Such a motif was also found on the back of a 19th-century sled where the Sun, in the form of a circle, is in the palace and two Zoryas stand in the exit, and on a peasant rushnyk from the Tver region where Zoryas on horseback rides up to the Sun, one is red and the other is green.

Baltic mythology
According to scholarship, Lithuanian folklore attests a similar dual role for luminous deities Vakarine and Ausrine: Vakarine, the Evening Star, made the bed for solar goddess Saulė, and Aušrinė, the Morning Star, lit the fire for her as she prepared for another day's journey. In other accounts, Ausrine and Vakarine are said to be daughters of the female Sun (Saule) and male Moon (Meness), and they tend their mother's palace and horses.

Russian tradition 
In Russian tradition, they often appear as two virgin sisters: Zorya Utrennyaya (Morning Zorya, from útro "morning") as the goddess of dawn, and Zorya Vechernyaya (Evening Aurora, from véčer "evening") as the goddess of dusk. Each was to stand on a different side of the golden throne of the Sun. The Morning Zorya opened the gate of the heavenly palace when the Sun set out in the morning, and the Evening Zorya closed the gate when the Sun returned to his abode for the night. The headquarters of Zorya was to be located on Buyan Island.

A myth from a later period speaks of three Zoryas and their special task:

Zorya also patronized marriages, as manifested by her frequent appearance in wedding songs, and arranged marriages between the gods. In one of the Malo-Russian songs, where the Moon meets Aurora while wandering in the sky, she is directly attributed this function:

In folk incantations and popular medicine
Zara-Zaranitsa (aka "Dawn the Red Maiden") appears interchangeably with Maria (Mother of God) in different versions of the same zagovory plots as the supreme power that a practitioner applies to.

She was also prayed to as Zarya for good harvests and health:

Professor Bronislava Kerbelytė cited that in Russian tradition, the Zoryas were also invoked to help in childbirth (with the appellation "зорки заряночки") and to treat the baby (calling upon "заря-девица", or "утренняя заря Параскавея" and "вечерняя заря Соломонея").

Zarya was also invoked as protectress and to dispel nightmares and sleeplessness:

Заря, зарница, васъ три сестрицы, утренняя, полуденная, вечерняя, полуночная, сыми съ раба Божія (имя) тоску, печаль, крикъ, безсонницу, подай ему сонъ со всѣхъ сторонъ, со всѣхъ святыхъ, со всѣхъ небесныхъ.

In another incantation, Zarya-Zarnitsa is invoked along with a "morning Irina" and a "Midday Daria" to dispel a child's sadness and take it away "beyond the blue ocean".

Further attestation
Croatian historian Natko Nodilo noted in his study The Ancient Faith of the Serbs and the Croats that the ancient Slavs saw Zora as a "shining maiden" ("svijetla" i "vidna" djevojka), and Russian riddles described her as a maiden that lived in the sky ("Zoru nebesnom djevojkom").

As for the parentage of the Dawn, she is referred "in a Russian song" as "dear little Dawn" and as the "Sister of the Sun".

Belarusian tradition 
In Belarusian folklore she appears as Zaranitsa (Зараніца) or as Zara-zaranitsa (Зара-Зараніца). In one of the passages, Zaranica is met by St. George and St. Nicholas, who, according to comparative mythology, function as divine twins, who in Indo-European mythologies are usually brothers of the goddess of the dawn: "Saint George was walking with Saint Nicholas and met Aurora".

In folklore she also appears in the form of a riddle:

This is about the dew, which the moon does not react to and which disappears under the influence of the sun. Zara is probably simply the goddess of the dawn, and can be translated literally as "Dawn", and Zaranica is a diminutive and may indicate respect towards her.

In Belarusian tradition, the stars are sometimes referred to as zorki and zory, such as the star Polaris, known as Zorny Kol ('star pole') and polunochna zora ('star of midnight').

Polish tradition 
In Polish folklore, there are three sister Zoras (Trzy Zorze): Morning Zorza (Polish: Zorza porankowa or Utrenica), Midday Zora (Zorza południowa or Południca) and Evening Zora (Zorza wieczorowa or Wieczornica), which appear in Polish folk charms and, according to Andrzej Szyjewski, represent a threefold division of the day. They also function as Rozhanitsy:

Another folk saying from Poland is thus: Żarze, zarzyczki, jest was trzy, zabierzcie od mojego dziecka płakanie, przywróćcie mu spanie.

In a magical love charm from Poland, the girl asks for the dawn (or morning-star) to go to the girl's beloved and force him to love no other but her:

Witajze zorze
Welcome, morning star

Ukrainian tradition 
The Ukrainian language also has words deriving from "Zorya": зі́рка (dialectal зі́ра "zira" and зі́ри "ziry") zírka, a diminutive meaning 'little star', 'starlet', 'asterisk'; зі́рнйця "zirnitsa" (or зі́рнйці "zirnytsi"), a poetic term meaning 'little star', 'aurora, dawn'.

In a saying collected in "Харківщині" (Kharkiv Oblast), it is said that "there are many stars (Зірок) in the sky, but there are only two Zori: the morning one (світова) and the evening one (вечірня)".

In an orphan's lament, the mourner says he will take the "keys of the dawn" ("То я б в зорі ключі взяла").

In a magical love charm, the girl invokes "three star-sisters" (or the "dawn-sisters"):

Vy zori-zirnytsi, vas na nebi tri sestrytsi: odna nudna, druga pryvitna, a tretia pechal'na
You dawn-stars, you three sisters in the sky: one dull, the second welcoming, and the third sorrowful

Slovene tradition
In a Slovene folksong titled "Zorja prstan pogubila" (Zorja lost her ring), the singer asks for mother ("majko"), brother ("bratca"), sister ("sestro") and darling ("dragog") to look for it.

According to professor Monika Kropej, in Slovene mythopoetic tradition, the sun rises in the morning, accompanied by the morning dawn, named Sončica (from sonce, 'sun'), and sets in the evening joined by an evening dawn named Zarika (from zarja, 'dawn'). These female characters also appear in a Slovenian narrative folk song about their rivalry. F. S. Copeland also interpreted both characters as mythological Sun and Dawn, as well as mentioned another ballad, titled Ballad of Beautiful Zora. Slovene folklorist Jakob Kelemina (sl), in his book about Slovene myths and folk-tales, stated that a Zora appears as the daughter of the Snake Queen (possibly an incarnation of the night) in the so-called Kresnik Cycle.

East Slavic tradition
According to professor Daiva Vaitkevičienė, the Virgin Mary most likely replaced deity Zaria in East Slavic charms. The Virgin Mary is also addressed as "Zaria" in Russian charms.

In a charm collected in Arkhangelsky and published in 1878 by historian Alexandra Efimenko (ru), the announcer invokes зоря Мария and заря Маремъяния, translated as "Maria-the-Dawn" and "Maremiyaniya-the-Dawn".

In another charm, the "Evening Star Mariya" and "Morning Star Maremiyana" are invoked to take away sleeplessness.

Slavic tradition
Goddess Zaria (alternatively, a trio of deities named Zori) is also invoked in charms against illness. According to professor Daiva Vaitkevičienė, this "is a very popular motif of the Slavic charms".

Legacy 
The word "Zorya" has become a loanword in Romanian language as its word for "dawn" (zori) and as the name of a piece of music sung by colinda tori (zorile).

The Morning Star is also known as dennica, zornica or zarnica.

In Serbo-Croatian languages, the planet Venus is known as Zornjača, when it appears in the morning, and Večernjača when it appears at night.

In a folksong, the Dawn/Morning Star is depicted as the bride of a male Moon.

In some Croatian folk songs, collected and published in 1876 by Rikardo Ferdinand Plohl-Herdvigov, a "zorja" is used along with "Marja" in "Zorja Marja prsten toči"; and referred to as "Zorja, zorija" in "Marija sinku načinila košulju";

Zorya in culture 
 Popular folk song Zoryushka (Зорюшка) sung on a wedding day.
 In the 2001 novel American Gods, and its 2017 television adaptation, author Neil Gaiman depicts Zorya as a triple goddess: Zorya Utrennyaya (morning star), Zorya Polunochnaya (midnight star), and Zorya Vechernyaya (evening star).
 Zorya appears in The Iron Druid Chronicles by Kevin Hearne.
 One of the works by Australian composer Julian Cochran is named Zorya Vechernyaya.
 One of the albums by Czech composer Floex is called Zorya, and the last number on the album is called Zorya Polunochnaya.
 Zorya figures prominently in EVE Online as the leader of the invading precursor entity, the Triglavian Collective.

See also 
 Ēostre
 Uzume
 Dali
 Orvandil

Notes

Citations

Bibliography

External links 
  performed by the Werchowyna band
  performed by the Drużyna Grodu Trzygłowa band

H₂éwsōs
Mercurian deities
Night goddesses
Slavic goddesses
Stellar goddesses
Triple goddesses
Venusian deities
Virgin goddesses
Dawn goddesses